Palaran Stadium is the main sports venue of Samarinda, the capital city of East Kalimantan province. It is a multi-purpose stadium located at the center of the East Kalimantan Main Stadium Sports Complex. It was opened in 2008 and has a seating capacity of 35.000. It is the largest stadium on the island of Borneo. The stadium was the main venue for the 2008 Indonesia National Games. It is the first Indonesian all-seater stadium. The stadium has become abandoned and has not been redeveloped.

Sport events
 2008 Pekan Olahraga Nasional
 2008 National Paralympic Week
 2008–09 Liga Indonesia Premier Division Quarter-finals and Final
 2016 1st East Kalimantan Governor Cup
 2018 2nd East Kalimantan Governor Cup

Galery

References

Sports venues in Indonesia
Sports venues in East Kalimantan
Sports venues in Samarinda
Football venues in Indonesia
Football venues in East Kalimantan
Football venues in Samarinda
Athletics (track and field) venues in Indonesia
Athletics (track and field) venues in East Kalimantan
Athletics (track and field) venues in Samarinda
Multi-purpose stadiums in Indonesia
Multi-purpose stadiums in East Kalimantan
Multi-purpose stadiums in Samarinda
Buildings and structures in East Kalimantan
Buildings and structures in Samarinda
Post-independence architecture of Indonesia
Sport in East Kalimantan
Sports venues completed in 2008
2008 establishments in Indonesia